William Herbert (by 1532 – 1576), of Cogan Pill, near Penarth, Glamorgan, was a Welsh politician.

He was a Member (MP) of the Parliament of England for Cardiff in 1558 and 1572.

References

1576 deaths
16th-century Welsh politicians
People from Penarth
Members of the Parliament of England (pre-1707) for constituencies in Wales
Year of birth uncertain
English MPs 1558
English MPs 1572–1583